Shani Glacier  is a glacier in the north of Shani Peak in Naltar Valley, Pakistan.

See also
Shani Peak
Naltar Valley
List of glaciers

External links
 Northern Pakistan detailed placemarks in Google Earth

Glaciers of Gilgit-Baltistan